Klämmingen is a lake in Södermanland, Sweden.

Lakes of Södermanland County